Aram was a historical region mentioned in early cuneiforms and in the Bible. The area of Aram did not develop into a bigger empire, it consisted of a number of small states in present-day Syria and northern Israel. Some of these states are mentioned in the Old Testament, Damascus being the most outstanding one, which came to encompass most of Syria. Furthermore, Aram-Damascus is commonly referred to as simply Aram in the Old Testament.

After the final conquest by the rising Neo-Assyrian Empire in the second half of the 8th century and also during the later consecutive rules of the Neo-Babylonian Empire (612–539 BCE) and the Achaemenid Empire (539–332 BCE), the region of Aram lost most of its sovereignty. During the Seleucid period (312-64 BCE), the term Syria was introduced as Hellenistic designation for this region, but the native name (Aram) persisted in use among Arameans, up to the Arab conquest in the 7th century CE. By the beginning of the 5th century, that practice also started to affect terminology of Aramean ecclesiastical and literary elites, and Syrian labels started to gain frequency and acceptance not only in Aramean translations of Greek works, but also in original works of Aramean writers. 

The Aramaic language eventually replaced Akkadian as the lingua franca of the entire region and became the administrative and commercial language of several empires such as the Achaemenid Empire and the Neo-Babylonian Empire. Early on, the Christian Bible was translated into Aramaic, and by the 4th century the local Aramaic dialect of Edessa (Urhay) developed into a literary language, known as Edessan Aramaic (Urhaya).

Etymology 

The choronym of the name Aram refers to the geographical region in which they lived and means High(landers). The toponym A-ra-mu appears in an inscription at the East Semitic speaking kingdom of Ebla listing geographical names, and the term Armi, which is the Eblaite term for nearby Idlib, occurs frequently in the Ebla tablets (c. 2300 BCE). One of the annals of Naram-Sin of Akkad (c. 2250 BCE) mentions that he captured "Dubul, the ensí of A-ra-me" (Arame is seemingly a genitive form), in the course of a campaign against Simurrum in the northern mountains. Other early references to a place or people of "Aram" have appeared at the archives of Mari (c. 1900 BCE) and at Ugarit (c. 1300 BCE). The terms Aram and Aramean frequently occur in the letters of a governor's archive from Nippur. The written text informed about farmers from Bīt-Aram referring to the region of Aram.

The word Aḫlamū was attested since the Old Babylonian period, first as designation for the Amorites and later for the Arameans. In the Assyrian royal inscriptions the term Aḫlamū and the name A-ra-mu are sometimes combined to form a double designation for Arameans. 
 
Early Jewish tradition claim that the name is derived from the biblical Aram, son of Shem, a grandson of Noah in the Bible.

History 

The Arameans appear to have displaced the earlier Semitic Amorite (Aḫlamū) populations of ancient Syria during the period from 1100 BC to 900 BC, which was a Dark Age for the entire Near East, North Africa, Caucasus, Mediterranean regions, with great upheavals and mass movements of people. The early history of the Arameans is tied to that of the Aḫlamū and Sutû who were already known in the Late Bronze Age and who seem to have played a role in the period's demise.  The Arameans rose to be the prominent group amongst the Ahlamu, and from c. 1200 BC on, the Amorites disappeared from the pages of history and the term Ahlamu underwent a semantic shift, becoming an accepted term for Aramean. From then on, the region that they had inhabited became known as Aram and Eber-Nari.

The Arameans emerged in a region which was largely under the domination of the Middle Assyrian Empire (1365–1050 BC) and quickly posed a threat to the Assyrian polity which was largely located west of the Euphrates. In order to nullify this threat, Tiglath-Pileser I (1115–1077 BC) of Assyria performed many campaigns in Aramean territory, although the numerous campaigns that the Assyrian records recorded that he took indicate that Assyrian military campaigns were unsuccessful at exercising power or dominance over the Arameans. Some scholars believe that the Arameans took Nineveh in this time. In the 11th century BC, Assyria fell into decline which may have been caused by the incursions of the emerging Arameans, allowing the Arameans to establish a string of states across the Levant and make notable expansions into Assyrian territory in this time such as in the Khabur Valley. During the period 1050 – 900 BC Arameans came to dominate most of what is now Syria but was then called Eber-Nari and Aramea.

Two medium-sized Aramaean kingdoms, Aram-Damascus and Hamath, along with several smaller kingdoms and independent city-states, developed in the region during the early first millennium BCE. The most notable of these were Bit Adini, Bit Bahiani, Bit Hadipe, Aram-Rehob, Aram-Zobah, Bit-Zamani, Bit-Halupe and Aram-Ma'akah, as well as the Aramean tribal polities of the Gambulu, Litau and Puqudu.

There was some synthesis with neo Hittite populations in northern Syria and south central Anatolia, and a number of small so called Syro-Hittite states arose in the region, such as Tabal. The east Mediterranean coast was largely dominated by Phoenician city states such as Tyre, Sidon, Berytus and Arvad.

With the advent of the Neo Assyrian Empire, the region was invaded on several occasions, since the middle of the 9th century, and finally fell under the control of Assyrian kings during the second half of the 8th century BCE. Large numbers of people living in the region were deported into Assyria, Babylonia and elsewhere. A few steles that name kings of this period have been found, such as the 8th-century Zakkur stele. The Assyrians and Babylonians themselves adopted a Mesopotamian form of Aramaic, known as Imperial Aramaic in the 8th century BC, when Tiglath-pileser III made it the lingua franca of his vast empire. The Neo Aramaic dialects still spoken by the indigenous Assyrians and Mandeans of northern Iraq, south east Turkey, north east Syria and north west Iran, descend from this language.

The Neo Assyrian Empire was riven by unremitting civil war from 626 BC onward, weakening it severely, and allowing it to be attacked and destroyed by a coalition of its former vassals between 616 and 605 BCE. The region of Aram was subsequently fought over by the Neo-Babylonian Empire and Egyptians, the latter of whom had belatedly come to the aid of their former Assyrian overlords. The Babylonians prevailed and Aram became a part of the Neo-Babylonian Empire (612–539 BC) where it remained named Eber-Nari.

The Persian Achaemenid Empire (539–332 BC) overthrew the Babylonians and conquered the region. They retained the Imperial Aramaic introduced by the Assyrians, and the name of Eber-Nari.

In 332 BC the region was conquered by the Greek ruler, Alexander the Great. Upon his death in 323 BC this area became part of the Greek Seleucid Empire, at which point Greek replaced the Assyrian introduced Imperial Aramaic as the official language of Empire, as were the names Eber-Nari and Aramea. This area and other parts of the former Assyrian Empire to the east (including Assyria itself) were renamed Syria (Seleucid Syria), a 9th-century BC Hurrian, Luwian and Greek corruption of Assyria (see Etymology of Syria and Name of Syria), which had for centuries until this point referred specifically to the land of Assyria and the Assyrians, which in modern terms actually covered the northern half of Iraq, north east Syria, south east Turkey and the north western fringes of Iran, and not the bulk of modern Syria and Lebanon and its largely Aramean and Phoenician inhabitants.

It is from this period that the later Syria vs Assyria naming controversy arises, the Seleucids confusingly applied the name not only to the Mesopotamian land of Assyria itself, but also to the lands west of Euphrates which had never been part of Assyria itself, but merely Aramean, Phoenician, Neo-Hittite and Sutean inhabited colonies. When they lost control of Assyria itself to the Parthians, the name Syria survived but was dislocated from its original source, and was applied only to the land west of Euphrates that had once been part of the Assyrian empire, while Assyria-proper went back to being called Assyria (and also Athura/Assuristan). However, this situation led to both Assyrians and Arameans being dubbed Syrians and later Syriacs in Greco-Roman culture.

This area, by now called Syria, was fought over by Seleucids and Parthians during the 2nd century BCE, and later still by the Romans and Sassanid Persians. Palmyra, a powerful Aramean kingdom arose during this period,
and for a time it dominated the area and successfully resisted Roman and Persian attempts at conquest. The region eventually came under the control of the Byzantine Empire. Christianity began to take hold from the 1st to 3rd centuries AD, and the Aramaic language gradually supplanted Canaanite in Phoenecia and Hebrew in Palestine.

In the mid-7th century AD the region fell to the Arab Islamic conquest. The Aramaic language survived among a sizable portion of the population of Syria, who resisted Arabization. However, the native Western Aramaic of the Aramean Christian population of Syria is spoken today by only a few thousand people, the majority having now adopted the Arabic language. Mesopotamian Eastern Aramaic, which still contains a number of loan words from the Akkadian language, as well as structural similarities, still survives among the majority of ethnically distinct Assyrians, who are mainly based in northern Iraq, north east Syria, south east Turkey and north west Iran.

Culture
After the fall of the last Aramean kingdoms and city-states the Arameans isolated themselves mainly in Northern Mesopotamia and continued to maintain their culture and identity under Muslim rule till this day. Over one hundred dialects of Aramaic were spoken in the Middle East in the first half of the twentieth century by Arameans and smaller groups of Jews, Mandeans and Muslims.

Religion

Ancient Aramean Religion
Records  of  the  religion  and  worship  habits  among  ancient  Arameans  are fairly scarce. The Aramean pagan pantheon mainly consisted of common Semitic  gods  who  were  also  worshipped  by  other  Ancient Semitic-speaking peoples  kin  to  the  Arameans. Their  greatest god was  Hadad,  the  god  of  thunderstorms  and  fertility. He  was  also  known  as  Ramman meaning  “thunderer.”  Another  widespread name for this deity in Aramaic was Rahmana (“merciful”). Hadad was usually depicted as a bearded soldier striking with thunder or holding a double-edged sword in his hand. The bull was the symbolic animal of Hadad on which he often depicted as standing on the bull’s back. The main temple built in Hadad’s name was located in Aram-Damascus. The fate of this temple is remarkable, under the Roman Empire it was rebuilt as a Temple of Jupiter, during Byzantine times it was turned into a church and after the Arab conquest of Syria it became the biggest mosque of modern day Syria, named Umayyad Mosque. The name Bar-Hadad, which several Aramean kings bore, literally means son of Hadad. It was a royal title, so no one else had the right to be called by that name. Eventually the name lost its distinction, and despite its pagan origins, the Arameans preserved the name after the adoption of Christianity. After the Arameans became christianized there even was a bishop called Bar-Hadad. 

It appears from their inscriptions as well as from their names that the Arameans also worshipped other Mesopotamian gods such as Sin, Ishtar (whom they called Astarte), Shamash, Tammuz, Bel and Nergal, but also some Canaanite-Phoenician deities such as the storm-god, El, the supreme deity of Canaan, in addition to Anat (‘Atta) and others.

Language
With the spread of the Arameans in large numbers throughout Mesopotamia and the Levant the Aramaic language became the lingua franca of the whole Middle-East. It has served as a language of public life and administration of ancient kingdoms and empires, and also as a language of divine worship and religious study. It subsequently branched into several Neo-Aramaic languages that are still spoken in modern times.

Architecture and art

Aramean cities were enclosed by a city wall and a fortified upper town or citadel on which palaces and other representative buildings are located. The entrance of the palaces of the kings mostly included several steles of winged bulls or lions as a sign of power and dominance. Surprisingly, no temples have been excavated on the citadels of the major Aramean cities. The only remarkable exception is the temple in antis in Tell Afis. The fact that the main temple of Sam'al was not located in the capital city but on the rocky hill called Gerçin about seven kilometers north of Zincirli may indicate different solutions in the use of religious spaces.

The Aramean kings showed a different headgear and stylization of hair and beard compared to other nations at that time. They distinguished themselves by their exclusive headgears, medium-length beards and large curved noses. Especially a braid hanging down in front of their headgear was a typical form of Aramean art.

See also

References

Sources

External links

 
Ancient Syria
History of Aleppo
Ancient Upper Mesopotamia
Torah places
Hebrew Bible regions
Historical regions